Sciacca is a surname. Notable people with the surname include:

Con Sciacca (1947–2017), Australian politician 
Fabio Sciacca (born 1989), Italian footballer
Gary Sciacca (born 1960), American horse trainer
Giacomo Sciacca (born 1996), Italian footballer
Giuseppe Sciacca (born 1955), Italian Roman Catholic official
Paul Sciacca (1909–1986), American mobster